Beit Chabab (Syriac: Bet Shebāba) is a mountain village 24 km north of Beirut in Lebanon.

Beit Chabeb is the site of Lebanon's one and only bell foundry.  The bells of Beit Chabab are sold to Christian communities in Lebanon and abroad to many foreign countries.  The village was completely embosomed in mulberry gardens at the turn of the century. The Hôpital Beit Chabab - Collège du Liban pour les handicapés is located in the village

History
Ottoman tax records indicate Beit Chabab had a population of 27 Muslim households (unspecified whether Sunni, Shia or Druze) in 1523, 32 Christian households in 1530, and 28 Christian households and two bachelors in 1543.

The oldest church in Beit Chabab is Our Lady of the Forest, which was built in 1761.

Etymology
The name "Beit Chabab" is widely believed to originate from the Arabic Bayt shabāb (meaning:"house of the young men"), but in reality it might have roots in Syriac. Anis Freiha argues in his Dictionary of the Names of Town and Villages in Lebanon that it comes from the Syriac Bet Shebāba meaning "house of the neighbor".

References

Bibliography

External links
 Beit Chabab - Chaouiyeh El Qnaytra,  Localiban

Populated places in the Matn District
Maronite Christian communities in Lebanon

ar:بيت شباب